Char Bara Lamchhi Dhali is a village in Bhola District in the Barisal Division of southern-central Bangladesh.

References

Populated places in Bhola District